The following television stations broadcast on digital channel 32 in the United States:

 K32AB-D in Yuma, Colorado, on virtual channel 4, which rebroadcasts KCNC-TV
 K32AG-D in Parowan, Enoch, etc., Utah
 K32CA-D in Battle Mountain, Nevada
 K32CC-D in Montgomery Ranch, etc., Oregon
 K32CJ-D in Ely, Nevada
 K32CQ-D in Shurz, Nevada
 K32CW-D in Montrose, Colorado
 K32DC-D in Kanab, Utah, on virtual channel 4, which rebroadcasts KTVX
 K32DE-D in Pendleton, Oregon
 K32DK-D in Watertown, South Dakota
 K32DW-D in Chloride, Arizona
 K32DY-D in Medford, Oregon
 K32EB-D in Alexandria, Minnesota, on virtual channel 9, which rebroadcasts KMSP-TV
 K32EH-D in Memphis, Texas
 K32EM-D in Morongo Valley, California, on virtual channel 32
 K32EX-D in Peetz, Colorado, on virtual channel 9, which rebroadcasts KUSA
 K32EY-D in Dove Creek, etc., Colorado, on virtual channel 27, which rebroadcasts K26CI-D
 K32FI-D in Yoncalla, Oregon
 K32FW-D in Pierre, South Dakota
 K32FY-D in Park Rapids, Minnesota, on virtual channel 42, which rebroadcasts KSAX
 K32GB-D in Agana, Guam
 K32GD-D in Guymon, Oklahoma
 K32GK-D in Elko, Nevada
 K32GW-D in Carson City, Nevada
 K32GX-D in St. James, Minnesota
 K32HA-D in Bonners, Idaho
 K32HF-D in Florence, Oregon
 K32HH-D in Kalispell, Montana
 K32HK-D in Morgan, etc., Utah, on virtual channel 5, which rebroadcasts KSL-TV
 K32HL-D in Rulison, Colorado
 K32HP-D in Hanna, etc., Utah
 K32HQ-D in Boulder, Utah
 K32HV-D in Vernal, etc., Utah, on virtual channel 7, which rebroadcasts KUED
 K32HX-D in Duchesne, Utah, on virtual channel 5, which rebroadcasts KSL-TV
 K32IA-D in Manila, etc., Utah
 K32IC-D in Altus, Oklahoma
 K32IF-D in North Fork, etc., Wyoming
 K32IG-D in Ellensburg, etc., Washington
 K32IJ-D in Cortez, Colorado
 K32IK-D in San Luis Valley, Colorado
 K32IS-D in Henefer, etc., Utah
 K32IT-D in Coalville and adjacent area, Utah
 K32IU-D in Wanship, Utah
 K32IX-D in Lihue, Hawaii
 K32IZ-D in Scofield, Utah
 K32JB-D in Fountain Green, Utah
 K32JI-D in Emery, Utah
 K32JL-D in Powers, Oregon
 K32JN-D in Big Piney, etc., Wyoming
 K32JQ-D in Manhattan, Kansas
 K32JT-D in Farmington, New Mexico
 K32JU-D in Tampico, etc., Montana
 K32JW-D in Fillmore, etc., Utah
 K32JZ-D in Kabetogama, Minnesota
 K32KC-D in Montpelier, Idaho
 K32KO-D in Garden Valley, Idaho
 K32KP-D in Black Butte Ranch, Oregon
 K32KQ-D in Orovada, Nevada
 K32KT-D in Wichita Falls, Texas
 K32KY-D in Pasco, Washington
 K32LO-D in Prescott, Arizona, on virtual channel 32, which rebroadcasts K19IP-D
 K32LQ-D in Yreka, California
 K32LS-D in Driggs, Idaho
 K32LT-D in San Luis Obispo, California
 K32LX-D in Soda Springs, Idaho
 K32LY-D in La Grande, Oregon
 K32LZ-D in Alton, Utah
 K32MC-D in Baker Flats Area, Washington
 K32MD-D in Cheyenne Wells, Colorado
 K32ME-D in Camp Verde, etc., Arizona
 K32MF-D in Red Lake, Minnesota, on virtual channel 19, which rebroadcasts WGN-TV
 K32MG-D in Enid, Oklahoma
 K32MH-D in Washington, etc., Utah
 K32MI-D in Delta/Oak City, etc, Utah
 K32MK-D in Park City, Utah, on virtual channel 9, which rebroadcasts KUEN
 K32ML-D in Rural Garfield County, Utah
 K32MN-D in Howard, Montana
 K32MO-D in Capitol Reef National Park, Utah
 K32MP-D in Caineville, Utah
 K32MQ-D in Fremont, Utah
 K32MR-D in Escalante, Utah
 K32MT-D in Tropic, etc., Utah
 K32MU-D in Hanksville, Utah
 K32MV-D in Antimony, Utah
 K32MW-D in Logan, Utah
 K32MX-D in Randolph & Woodruff, Utah
 K32MY-D in Heber/Midway, Utah, on virtual channel 11, which rebroadcasts KBYU-TV
 K32MZ-D in Samak, Utah
 K32NA-D in Ridgecrest, California, on virtual channel 11, which rebroadcasts KTTV
 K32NB-D in Beaver etc., Utah
 K32NC-D in Toquerville, Utah, on virtual channel 7, which rebroadcasts KUED
 K32ND-D in Modena, etc., Utah
 K32NE-D in Garrison, etc., Utah
 K32NF-D in Spring Glen, Utah
 K32NG-D in Green River, Utah
 K32NH-D in Ferron, Utah
 K32NI-D in Clear Creek, Utah
 K32NK-D in Lincoln City, etc., Oregon, on virtual channel 2, which rebroadcasts KATU
 K32NL-D in Deming, New Mexico
 K32NM-D in Des Moines, Iowa
 K32NO-D in Glenwood Springs, Colorado
 K32NQ-D in Salmon, Idaho
 K32NR-D in Winnemucca, Nevada
 K32NT-D in Crested Butte, Colorado, on virtual channel 8, which rebroadcasts K06HN-D
 K32NU-D in Haxtun, Colorado, on virtual channel 6, which rebroadcasts KRMA-TV
 K32NV-D in Malad City, Iowa
 K32NW-D in Mina/Luning, Nevada
 K32OB-D in Panaca, Nevada
 K32OC-D in Corpus Christi, Texas
 K32OE-D in Alamogordo, New Mexico
 K32OF-D in Elk City, Oklahoma
 K32OG-D in Pueblo, Colorado
 K32OI-D in Eureka, California
 K32OK-D in Woody Creek, Colorado
 K32OL-D in Redstone, Colorado
 K32OV-D in Lubbock, Texas
 K32OX-D in Lucerne Valley, California, on virtual channel 9, which rebroadcasts KCAL-TV
 K32PB-D in Lake Charles, Louisiana
 K38DZ-D in Joplin, Montana
 K40DJ-D in Coolin, Idaho
 K46LY-D in Livingston, Montana
 K48KC-D in Cottage Grove, Oregon
 K50HJ-D in Litchfield, California
 KABI-LD in Snyder, Texas
 KAJS-LD in Lincoln, Nebraska
 KAOB-LD in Beaumont, Texas
 KARK-TV in Little Rock, Arkansas
 KBLT-LD in Anchorage, Alaska
 KCEC in Boulder, Colorado, on virtual channel 14
 KCNS in San Francisco, California, on virtual channel 38
 KDAF in Dallas, Texas, on virtual channel 33
 KDDC-LD in Dodge City, Kansas
 KDYS-LD in Spokane, Washington
 KEJR-LD in Phoenix, Arizona, on virtual channel 40
 KEMO-TV in Fremont, California, uses KCNS' spectrum, on virtual channel 50
 KENW in Portales, New Mexico
 KFAW-LD in Midland, Texas
 KFKK-LD in Stockton, California, on virtual channel 32
 KFKZ-LD in Cedar Falls, Iowa
 KION-TV in Monterey, California
 KJEO-LD in Fresno, California
 KLEW-TV in Lewiston, Idaho
 KLNM-LD in Lufkin, Texas
 KMCC in Laughlin, Nevada
 KMEG in Sioux City, Iowa
 KMTI-LD in Manti and Ephraim, Utah, on virtual channel 8
 KMYN-LD in Duluth, Minnesota
 KMYS in Kerrville, Texas
 KNET-CD in Los Angeles, California, uses KNLA-CD's spectrum, on virtual channel 25
 KNLA-CD in Los Angeles, California, on virtual channel 20
 KNMT in Portland, Oregon, on virtual channel 24
 KOLD-TV in Tucson, Arizona
 KPMC-LD in Bakersfield, California
 KPTO-LD in Pocatello, Idaho
 KPXB-TV in Conroe, Texas, on virtual channel 49
 KPXJ in Minden, Louisiana
 KPXO-TV in Kaneohe, Hawaii
 KQKC-LD in Topeka, Kansas
 KRMS-LD in Lake Ozark, Missouri
 KRMV-LD in Walnut, California, on virtual channel 50, which rebroadcasts KOCE-TV
 KRSU-TV in Claremore, Oklahoma
 KRUM-LD in Seattle, Washington, on virtual channel 24
 KSBT-LD in Santa Barbara, California
 KSMO-TV in Kansas City, Missouri, and ATSC 3.0 station, on virtual channel 62
 KSTV-LD in Sacramento, California, on virtual channel 32
 KTFV-CD in McAllen, Texas
 KTNC-TV in San Francisco, California, uses KCNS' spectrum, on virtual channel 42
 KUMO-LD in St Louis, Missouri, on virtual channel 51
 KUPT-LD in Albuquerque, New Mexico
 KUTH-DT in Provo, Utah, on virtual channel 32
 KVPT in Fresno, California
 KYPK-LD in Yakima, Washington
 W32CV-D in Ironwood, Michigan
 W32DH-D in Erie, Pennsylvania
 W32DJ-D in Melbourne, Florida, to move to channel 19, on virtual channel 32
 W32EG-D in Williams, Minnesota
 W32EI-D in Port Jervis, New York, to move to channel 33, on virtual channel 32
 W32EO-D in Tryon, etc., North Carolina
 W32EQ-D in Tuscaloosa, Alabama
 W32EV-D in Adamsville, Tennessee
 W32EW-D in Roanoke, Virginia
 W32FB-D in Ceiba, Puerto Rico
 W32FD-D in Louisa, Kentucky
 W32FE-D in Hartwell & Royston, Georgia
 W32FH-D in St. Petersburg, Florida, on virtual channel 33
 W32FI-D in Brevard, North Carolina
 W32FJ-D in Montgomery, Alabama
 W32FK-D in Valdosta, Georgia
 W32FN-D in Macon, Georgia
 W32FS-D in Bangor, Maine
 W32FW-D in Adams, Massachusetts
 W32FY-D in Clarksburg, West Virginia
 WAAO-LD in Andalusia, Alabama
 WABG-TV in Greenwood, Mississippi
 WACX-LD in Alachua, etc., Florida
 WANE-TV in Fort Wayne, Indiana
 WANF-LD in Jackson, Tennessee
 WAXN-TV in Kannapolis, North Carolina, an ATSC 3.0 station, on virtual channel 64
 WBFS-TV in Miami, Florida, on virtual channel 33
 WBMA-LD in Birmingham, Alabama
 WBOC-TV in Salisbury, Maryland
 WBTS-CD in Nashua, New Hampshire, uses WGBX-TV's spectrum, on virtual channel 15
 WBXH-CD in Baton Rouge, Louisiana
 WCAV in Charlottesville, Virginia
 WCCO-TV in Minneapolis, Minnesota, on virtual channel 4
 WCTA-LD in Columbus, Georgia
 WDIV-TV in Detroit, Michigan, on virtual channel 4
 WDRB in Louisville, Kentucky
 WDRN-LD in Fayetteville, North Carolina, on virtual channel 45
 WETK in Burlington, Vermont
 WFPX-TV in Archer Lodge, North Carolina, uses WRPX-TV's spectrum, on virtual channel 62
 WFQX-TV in Cadillac, Michigan
 WFSU-TV in Tallahassee, Florida
 WGBX-TV in Boston, Massachusetts, on virtual channel 44
 WHLV-TV in Cocoa, Florida, on virtual channel 52
 WHP-TV in Harrisburg, Pennsylvania
 WICD in Champaign, Illinois
 WIFS in Janesville, Wisconsin
 WIPM-TV in Mayaguez, Puerto Rico, on virtual channel 3
 WITN-TV in Washington, North Carolina
 WJMN-TV in Escanaba, Michigan
 WJWJ-TV in Beaufort, South Carolina
 WKHU-CD in Kittanning, Pennsylvania, on virtual channel 60, which rebroadcasts WOSC-CD
 WKPT-TV in Kingsport, Tennessee
 WLIW in Garden City, New York, on virtual channel 21
 WLOX in Biloxi, Mississippi
 WLPD-CD in Plano, Illinois, on virtual channel 30
 WMBF-TV in Myrtle Beach, South Carolina
 WMVH-CD in Charleroi, Pennsylvania, on virtual channel 26, which rebroadcasts WOSC-CD
 WNDR-LD in Auburn, New York
 WNPX-TV in Franklin, Tennessee, on virtual channel 28
 WOUB-TV in Athens, Ohio
 WPXV-TV in Norfolk, Virginia
 WQEO-LD in Memphis, Tennessee
 WRNT-LD in Hartford, Connecticut, on virtual channel 32
 WRPX-TV in Rocky Mount, North Carolina, on virtual channel 47
 WRZB-LD in Washington, D.C., on virtual channel 31
 WSB-TV in Atlanta, Georgia, on virtual channel 2
 WSJU-LD in Ceiba, Puerto Rico, on virtual channel 42
 WSRG-LD in Scranton, Pennsylvania
 WTHV-LD in Huntsville, Alabama
 WTJR in Quincy, Illinois
 WTKO-CD in Oneida, New York
 WTMJ-TV in Milwaukee, Wisconsin, on virtual channel 4
 WUCB-LD in Cobleskill, New York
 WUTV in Buffalo, New York
 WWTO-TV in Naperville, Illinois, uses WLPD-CD's spectrum, on virtual channel 35
 WXBU in Lancaster, Pennsylvania, uses WHP-TV's spectrum
 WXCW in Naples, Florida
 WYFX-LD in Youngstown, Ohio
 WZPA-LD in Philadelphia, Pennsylvania, on virtual channel 33

The following stations, which are no longer licensed, formerly broadcast on digital channel 32:
 K32DR-D in Granite Falls, Minnesota
 K32EL-D in Shoshoni, Wyoming
 K32HO-D in Fruitland, Utah
 K32JE-D in Quincy, Washington
 K32JG-D in Rapid City, South Dakota
 K32JJ-D in Rolla, Missouri
 K32JK-D in Boise, Idaho
 K32JM-D in Twin Falls, Idaho
 K32NP-D in Billings, Montana
 KCFG in Flagstaff, Arizona
 KCLG-LD in Neosho, Missouri
 KYWF-LD in Wichita Falls, Texas
 W32DU-D in La Grange, Georgia
 WBAX-LD in Albany, New York
 WDYH-LD in Augusta, Georgia
 WSBN-TV in Norton, Virginia

References

32 digital